glbinding is a generated, cross-platform C++ binding for OpenGL which is solely based on the new XML-based OpenGL API specification. It is a fully fledged OpenGL API binding, compatible with current code based on other C bindings, e.g., GLEW. The binding is generated using Python scripts and templates, that can be easily adapted to fit custom needs. It leverages modern C++11 features like scoped enums, lambdas, and variadic templates, instead of relying on macros (all OpenGL symbols are real functions and variables). It provides type-safe parameters, per feature API header, lazy function resolution, multi-context and multi-thread support, global function callbacks, meta information about the generated OpenGL binding and the OpenGL runtime, as well as multiple examples for quick-starting projects.

The complete glbinding source code including the generated files are published under the MIT License.

See also 
 OpenGL Easy Extension library (GLee)
 OpenGL Extension Wrangler Library (GLEW)

References

External links 
 

Free software
OpenGL